Asia was launched at Philadelphia. Early records have her launch year as 1795, but later records have it as 1798. She entered British records in 1800 as trading with the Far East. As the British East India Company had a monopoly of British trade with the Far East, Asia almost certainly did not sail under the British flag, though she did operate from Britain. In 1805 the privateer Mercury seized her and the High Court of Admiralty condemned Asia for trading with France. New owners named her Duchess of York (or Dutchess of York, depending on the source). She then became a West Indiaman. She was wrecked at Guadeloupe in 1826.

Asia
Asia first appeared in British shipping registers in 1800.

On 22 May 1805 the Prize Court condemned Asia. The privateer Mercury had detained her for trading with the French.

Duchess of York
J. Annen & Co. purchased Asia and renamed her Duchess of York.

On 18 November 1810, Duchess of York was outbound from London to Rio de Janeiro when she ran aground on the Goodwin Sands. Some boats from Ramsgate got her off.

On 19 December 1812 a violent gale damaged Dutchess of York, Massingham, master, and several other vessels in the Tagus.

Loss
The transport Dutchess of York, Ford, master, was wrecked on 1 February 1826 on the north coast of Guadeloupe. All on board were rescued. Lloyd's Register and Register of Shipping no longer list her in 1827.

Citations

References
 

1798 ships
Age of Sail merchant ships
Merchant ships of the United Kingdom
Maritime incidents in 1805
Maritime incidents in 1810
Maritime incidents in 1812
Maritime incidents in February 1826
Shipwrecks in the North Sea
Shipwrecks in the Caribbean Sea